The 1982 Pacific Southwest Open, also known by its sponsored name Thrifty Union 76 Pacific Southwest Open, was a men's tennis tournament played on outdoor hard courts at the Los Angeles Tennis Club in Los Angeles, California in the United States. The event was part of the Grand Prix tennis circuit. It was the 56th edition of the Pacific Southwest tournament and was held from April 12 through April 18, 1982. First-seeded Jimmy Connors won the singles title and the corresponding $40,000 first-prize money.

Finals

Singles
 Jimmy Connors defeated  Mel Purcell 6–2, 6–1
 It was Connors' 2nd singles title of the year and the 91st of his career.

Doubles
 Sherwood Stewart /  Ferdi Taygan defeated  Bruce Manson /  Brian Teacher 6–1, 6–7, 6–3

References

External links
 ITF tournament edition details

Los Angeles Open (tennis)
Pacific Southwest Open
Pacific Southwest Open
Pacific Southwest Open
Pacific Southwest Open